Geoffrey Simmons (born 28 July 1943) is a medical doctor, science fiction author and proponent of intelligent design from Eugene, Oregon. He has a BS in biology from the University of Illinois and received an M.D. from the University of Illinois Medical School in 1969. He was a doctor of internal medicine for the PeaceHealth Medical Group in Eugene, boarded in internal medicine and disaster medicine. Dr. Simmons retired at the end of 2015.

Biography
Born in Fort Gordon, Georgia, in 1943, Simmons is a fellow at the Center for Science and Culture, part of the Discovery Institute. He toured with PSSI in Spain with the Spanish version of What Darwin Didn't Know, to five cities: Barcelona, Málaga, Madrid, León and Vigo, nine lectures altogether. He has lectured at college campuses, churches and synagogues. Simmons also teaches disaster preparedness locally, regionally and nationally. He is a Governor on the Board of Governors for the American Academy of Disaster Medicine and an Advisor to FEMA on the Advisory Council for FEMA Region X. He is a CERT trainer and volunteer CERT Coordinator for the City of Eugene. He  has lectured at the IAEM and NASA. His newest book Common Sense and Disaster Preparedness will be published by the Journal of Emergency Management (JEM), Fall 2010.

Intelligent design
Simmons has written nine books, four fiction, two medical spoofs, and two books about the creation–evolution controversy, published by a Christian publishing house and promotes the pseudoscience of intelligent design. In 2008, he debated evolutionary biologist PZ Myers, among many professors, on KKMS radio. He has done other radio interviews, such as on Coast to Coast AM in 2007

Works
The Glue Factory. (Beckett Publishing Company, November 1, 1995) (Illustrated by Ray Broderick)  
What Darwin Didn't Know: A Doctor Dissects the Theory of Evolution . (Harvest Publishers, January 1, 2004) (Foreword by William Dembski)  
Billions of Missing Links: A Rational Look at the Mysteries Evolution Can't Explain. (Harvest House Publishers, February 15, 2007) 
Common Sense and Disaster Preparedness, Journal of Emergency Management, Fall 2010

Fiction 

 The Z Papers, Arbor House and Bantam, 1970s
 The Adam Experiment, Arbor House and Berkley, 1970s
 Pandemic, Arbor House and Berkley, 1980s.
 MURDOCK, Arbor House, 1980s
 The Glue Factory factor,  Beckett, 1990s
 To Glue or Not To Glue. Beckett, 1990s

References

External links
Geoffrey Simmons from Discovery Institute
Are Darwin's Theories Fact or Faith Issues? Debate with PZ Myers

1943 births
Living people
Discovery Institute fellows and advisors
Intelligent design advocates
Physicians from Oregon
Writers from Eugene, Oregon
American male novelists